The following events related to sociology occurred in the 1830s.

1831
Events
Lambert Adolphe Jacques Quetelet's The Propensity to Crime is published.

1834
Events
 Harriet Martineau's Illustrations of Taxation is published.

Deaths
 December 23: Thomas Malthus (born February 13, 1766)

1835
Events
Lambert Adolphe Jacques Quételet' On Man and the Development of Human Facilities, An essay in Social Physics
Alexis de Tocqueville's Democracy in America is published.

1837
Events
Harriet Martineau' Society in America

1838
Events
Harriet Martineau' How to Observe Morals and Manners`

References

Sociology
Sociology timelines